Hebron is an unincorporated community on Glady Creek in Marion County, West Virginia, United States. It takes its name from the Hebron Church  there.

References 

Unincorporated communities in Marion County, West Virginia
Unincorporated communities in West Virginia